Sultan Al-Sherif  (born 26 December 1991) is a Saudi football player who currently plays for Al-Shaeib as a midfielder.

Career
Al-Sherif began his career at Al-Ahli and signed his first professional contract with the club on 25 June 2012. On 24 June 2013, Al-Sherif joined Pro League side Najran on a one-year contract. On 22 June 2014, Al-Sherif renewed his contract with Najran. On 12 July 2015, Al-Sherif joined Al-Raed. On 30 June 2018, Al-Sherif joined First Division side Al-Washm on a free transfer. On 6 July 2019, Al-Sherif joined Pro League side Abha. On 22 January 2020, Al-Sherif was released from his contract without making an appearance for the club. On 25 January 2020, Al-Sherif joined First Division side Al-Tai. On 4 October 2020, Al-Sherif joined Ohod.

References

 

1991 births
Living people
People from Medina
Saudi Arabian footballers
Al-Ahli Saudi FC players
Najran SC players
Al-Raed FC players
Al-Washm Club players
Abha Club players
Al-Tai FC players
Ohod Club players
Al Shaeib Club players
Saudi Professional League players
Saudi First Division League players
Saudi Second Division players
Association football midfielders